Ban Na is a district (amphoe) in the western part of Nakhon Nayok province, central Thailand.

History
In the Ayutthaya era, the people of Tambon Pa Kha were elephant catchers (กองโพนช้าง), catching wild elephants to use as war elephants.

Ban Na district was established in 1903, then named Tha Chang District. As the original district office in Tambon Bang O was inconvenient for transportation and prone for flooding, the government moved the office to Suwannason Road in 1965.

When Nakhon Nayok Province was downgraded, the government transferred Ban Na District to Saraburi province. It became a district of Nakhon Nayok again on 9 May 1946 when the province was re-established.

Geography
Neighboring districts are (from the east clockwise) Mueang Nakhon Nayok and Ongkharak of Nakhon Nayok Province; Nong Suea of Pathum Thani province; and Wihan Daeng and Kaeng Khoi of Saraburi province.

The important water resource is Khlong Ban Na.

Administration
The district is divided into 10 sub-districts (tambons), which are further subdivided into 117 villages (mubans). Ban Na is a sub-district municipality (thesaban tambon) which covers parts of tambons Ban Na and Phikun Ok. There are a further 10 tambon administrative organizations (TAO).

References

External links
amphoe.com (Thai)
Ban Na district history(Thai)

Ban Na